Sandra Amy is an Indian film and television actress and a video jockey.

Career 
Amy was born in Idukki. After appearing in supporting role in the Malayalam film Kasthooriman. Amy acted in Tamil films Poraali, Sivappu Enaku Pudikkum, Kathai Thiraikathai Vasanam Iyakkam,  Urumeen and Singam 3.

Filmography

Films

Television/Online

References

External links
 

Tamil television actresses
Actresses in Tamil television
Actresses from Thiruvananthapuram
Actresses in Tamil cinema
Actresses in Malayalam cinema
Living people
Indian film actresses
21st-century Indian actresses
Malayali people
People from Idukki district
Indian television actresses
Actresses in Malayalam television
Female models from Thiruvananthapuram
Year of birth missing (living people)